The Glover Trophy, also known as the Richmond Trophy, was a non-championship Formula One motor race held in the spring at Goodwood, England from 1949 to 1965.

In the 1962 race, Stirling Moss, who had won the race on two previous occasions and was considered one of the world's best racing drivers at the time, crashed at St Mary's corner on the 37th lap. The accident left him in a coma for several weeks and ended his career. The damaged helmet he was wearing at the time is currently on display as part of the Donington Grand Prix Collection.

In recent years the race has been revived as a historic racing event, forming a central part of the annual Goodwood Revival meeting.

Winners

References